Çağtay Kurukalıp (born 24 February 2002) is a Turkish football player who plays as a defender for Iğdır in the TFF Third League on loan from Fenerbahçe.

Professional career
Kurukalıp is a youth is a youth product of Kasımpaşa since 2014, and signed his first professional contract with them in 2018, keeping him at the club for 3 years. He made his professional debut with Kasımpaşa in a 3-1 Turkish Cup loss to Alanyaspor on 15 January 2020. On 30 June 2021, he signed a three year contract with Fenerbahçe.

On 7 January 2023, Kurukalıp joined Iğdır on loan.

International career
Kurukalıp is a youth international for Turkey, having represented the Turkey U16s, U17s and  U18.

References

External links
 
 
 Mackolik Profile

2002 births
Living people
People from Gaziosmanpaşa
Turkish footballers
Turkey youth international footballers
Kasımpaşa S.K. footballers
Fenerbahçe S.K. footballers
Süper Lig players
TFF Third League players
Association football forwards